Ciclesonide is a glucocorticoid used to treat asthma and allergic rhinitis. It is marketed under the brand names Alvesco for asthma and Omnaris, Omniair, Zetonna, and Alvesco for hay fever in the US and Canada.   

Side effects of the medication include headache, nosebleeds, and inflammation of the nose and throat linings.

It was patented in 1990 and approved for medical use in 2005. The drug was approved for adults and children 12 and over by the US Food and Drug Administration in October 2006. It is on the World Health Organization's List of Essential Medicines.

See also 
 Beclomethasone dipropionate

References

Further reading 

 

Secondary alcohols
Corticosteroid cyclic ketals
Glucocorticoids
Isobutyrate esters
Enones
AstraZeneca brands
Takeda Pharmaceutical Company brands